Gustaf Adolf "Gösta" Olson (10 May 1883 – 23 January 1966) was a Swedish gymnast and fencer who competed in the 1908 Summer Olympics. He was part of the Swedish gymnastics team that won the all-around gold medal, and was eliminated in the first round of the individual épée event.

See also
 Dual sport and multi-sport Olympians

References

External links
 
 

1883 births
1966 deaths
Swedish male artistic gymnasts
Swedish male épée fencers
Fencers at the 1908 Summer Olympics
Gymnasts at the 1908 Summer Olympics
Olympic gymnasts of Sweden
Olympic gold medalists for Sweden
Olympic medalists in gymnastics
Medalists at the 1908 Summer Olympics
Sportspeople from Linköping
Sportspeople from Östergötland County